Charles Jean Marie Barbaroux (6 March 1767 – 25 June 1794) was a French politician of the Revolutionary period and Freemason.

Biography

Early career
Born in Marseille, Barbaroux was educated at first by the local Oratorians, then studied law in Aix-en-Provence, and became a successful lawyer. He was appointed greffier to the commune of Marseille, and in 1792 was commissioned to go to the Legislative Assembly and demand the accusation of the directorate of the département of Bouches-du-Rhône, as accomplices in a Royalist movement in Arles.

In Paris, he was received in the Jacobin club, and contacted Jacques Pierre Brissot and the Rolands - Jean Marie Roland de la Platiere and Madame Roland. It was at his instigation that Marseille sent to Paris the battalion of volunteers that arrived in the city singing the Marseillaise, and which contributed to the Paris Commune insurrection remembered as the tenth of August 1792 against King Louis XVI.

Convention

Returning to Marseille, he helped to repress a Royalist movement in Avignon, and an ultra-Jacobin movement at Marseille, and was elected deputy to the National Convention with 775 votes out of 776 cast. He viewed himself as an opponent of the Montagnards from the first day of sessions, and accused Maximilien Robespierre of aiming to establish a dictatorship (25 September 1792), attacked Jean-Paul Marat, and proposed to break up the Commune of Paris. Afterwards, he got the Act of Accusation against the king adopted, and in the trial voted for his capital punishment "without appeal and without delay". He participated in the Constitution Committee that drafted the Girondin constitutional project.

During the final struggle between the Girondists and the Montagnards (Insurrection of 31 May - 2 June 1793), Barbaroux refused to resign as deputy, and rejected the offer made by the extremist group in Paris to give hostages for the arrested representatives. He succeeded in escaping, first to Caen, where he organized the Girondist rebellion, then to Saint-Émilion, where he wrote his Mémoires (first published in 1822 by his son, and re-edited in 1866). On 18 June Élie Guadet and Salle were arrested; Pétion de Villeneuve and Francois Buzot succeeded in killing themselves. Barbaroux attempted to shoot himself, but was only wounded. He was taken to Bordeaux, where he was guillotined once his identity was established.

References

 

1767 births
1794 deaths
Politicians from Marseille
Girondins
Deputies to the French National Convention
Regicides of Louis XVI
18th-century French lawyers
French Freemasons
18th-century French memoirists
French people executed by guillotine during the French Revolution